Seven & Seven is the sixth album released by American rapper MC Lyte. It was released on August 18, 1998, by East West Records and was produced by Milk Dee, Missy Elliott, The Neptunes, LL Cool J, Marc Kinchen, Dynamic Duo, Poke & Tone, L.E.S., Ron "Amen-Ra" Lawrence, DJ Peter Panic, MC Lyte and Nat Robinson. Seven & Seven was a critical success. It reached No. 71 on the Billboard Top R&B/Hip-Hop Albums chart. The first single released from the album was the Neptunes' produced single "I Can't Make a Mistake". Another Neptunes' production "It's All Yours" was released as a promotional single.

Track listing
"In My Business" – 4:23   (featuring Missy Elliott)
"Too Fly" – 4:18 (featuring Pamela Long)
"This Emcee" – 2:09
"Top Billin'" – 2:50 (featuring Milk Dee)
"Give Me What I Want" – 4:21
"Woo Woo (Party Time)" – 4:34 (featuring Nicci Gilbert)
"Playgirls Play" – 3:53
"Put It on You" – 4:04
"Propa" – 4:12 (featuring Beenie Man)
"It's All Yours" – 4:41 (featuring Gina Thompson)
"I Can't Make a Mistake" – 3:51
"Want What I Got" – 3:47 (featuring Missy Elliott & Mocha)
"Oogie Boogie" – 4:18
"Party Goin' On" – 4:17 (featuring Inaya Day) (Produced By DJ Peter Panic)
"Break It Down" – 3:50 (featuring La India & Giovanni Salah)
"Closer" – 4:21 (featuring Space Nine)
"Radio's Nightmare" – 0:53
"My Time" – 3:23
"Assaholic Anonymous" – 1:16
"King of Rock" – 2:22
"Better Place" – 5:36 (Produced By DJ Peter Panic)

Samples
"Give Me What I Want"
"Nasty Girl" by Vanity 6
"Better Place"
"Nightshift" by Commodores
"In My Business"
"The Star-Spangled Banner" by Francis Scott Key and John Stafford Smith
"King of Rock"
"I Cram to Understand U" by MC Lyte
"Oogie Boogie"
"Boogie Oogie Oogie" by A Taste of Honey
"Party Goin' On"
"Give Me Your Love" by Sylvia Striplin
"Playgirls Play"
"Do It ('Til You Sastified)" by B. T. Express
"The Choice Is Yours (Revisited)" by Black Sheep
"Propa."
"E.V.A." by Jean-Jacques Perrey
"Love Is the Message" by MFSB
"Put It On You"
"Fame" by David Bowie
"Radio's Nightmare"
"Impeach The President" by The Honey Drippers
"This Emcee"
"This Old Man" by Traditional Folk
"On the Good Ship Lollipop" by Shirley Temple
"Blame It on the Boogie" by The Jacksons
"Too Fly"
"All the Way Lover (Live)" by Millie Jackson
"P.Y.T. (Pretty Young Thing)" by Michael Jackson
"Stop, Look, Listen" by MC Lyte

Charts

References

1998 albums
MC Lyte albums
Albums produced by L.E.S. (record producer)
Albums produced by Missy Elliott
Albums produced by the Neptunes
Elektra Records albums